Shri Vishwakarma Skill University, Haryana, earlier known as Haryana Vishwakarma Skill University (HVSU) is a university established by the Government of Haryana at Dudhola village of Palwal district of India. It is currently running from a temporary campus in Gurugram. It has MoU with several industries and entities to impart skills training.

History 
It was established in 2016 via a legislative act of Government of Haryana, to impart skills training.

Objectives
It was set up to develop entrepreneurship and skill based education and research in the emerging areas of various sectors.

Courses
The university offers dual vocational education model in the integrated work and study mode in accordance with the National Skill Qualification Frame work (NSQF), where students will work in the industries across various locations in the State with flexible class timings.

Skill Faculty of Engineering and Technology
Skill Faculty of Applied Sciences and Humanities
Skill Faculty of Management Studies and Research
Skill Faculty of Agriculture

Skill Faculty of Engineering and Technology

Out-Campus Programmes 
 D.Voc. Mechanical-Manufacturing (ROOP)
 D.Voc. Mechanical-Manufacturing (SENIOR Flexonics, KRISHNA)
 D.Voc. Industrial Electronics (EAST WEST AUTOMATION)
 B.Voc. Mechanical-Manufacturing (ANAND)
 B.Voc. Mechanical-Manufacturing (Hero)
 B.Voc. Mechatronics (Hero)
 B.Voc. Robotics and Automation (JBM Group)
 B.Voc. Production-Tool and Die Manufacturing (JBM Group)
 B.Voc. Solar Technology (QUADSUN SOLAR SOLUTIONS)

In-Campus Programmes 
 B.Tech. in CSE with AI and ML (Amazon)
 B.Tech. Mechanical and Smart Manufacturing (JBM Group)
 M.Tech. Robotics and Automation (JBM Group)

Skill Faculty of Applied Sciences and Humanities

Out-Campus Programmes 
 Diploma in German Language (CONCENTRIX™)
 Diploma in Graphics and Communication Design (SVSU)
 B.Voc. Medical Laboratory Technology (Healthians, QRG, Rotary Blood Bank Gurugram)
 B.Voc. Public Service (ALS IAS Academy)
 M.Voc. Geo-Informatics (Gurugram Metropolitan Development Authority)
 M.Voc. Public Health (Gurugram Metropolitan Development Authority)

In-Campus Programmes 
 Diploma in Yoga (SVSU)
 Diploma in Music (Folk Art-Banchari)
 Diploma in Japanese Language (SVSU)
 Diploma in English Language (SVSU)

Skill Faculty of Management Studies and Research

Out-Campus Programmes 
 Diploma in Food Production and Traditional Sweets (BIKANERVALA)
 B.B.A. in Retail Management (Maruti Suzuki)
 B.Voc. Management-BPM and Analytics (CONCENTRIX)
 M.Voc. Management-Banking and Finance (HDFC Bank)
 M.Voc. Management-HRM (Mount Talent)
 M.Voc. Entrepreneurship (A C Sangam, AIM)

In-Campus Programmes 
 B.Voc. Management-Financial Services (SVSU)
 M.B.A. (IIMBx, Grant Thornton, Super Screws(P) Ltd.)
 M.B.A. Business Analytics (IIMBx, Grant Thornton, Super Screws(P) Ltd.)

Skill Faculty of Agriculture

Out-Campus Programmes 
 B.Voc. Agriculture (Shivansh Farming)
 M.Voc. Agriculture (Shivansh Farming)

List of Short Term Programmes 

 Organic Farming (3M)
 Hydroponic Producer (3M)
 Certificate in Music-Vocal (3M)
 Certificate in Music-Instrumental(Harmonium) (3M)
 Phlebotomist Technician (3M)
 General Duty Assistant (3M)
 Geriatrics (Elderly Care) (3M)
 Certificate in Sharda Lipi (4M)
 Block chain Developer (6M)
 Data Entry Operator (4M)
 Data Scientist (9M)
 IOT-Hardware Solution Designer (6M)
 Multimedia Developer (6M)
 Research Associate (3M)
 Office Coordinator (4M)
 Microfinance Associate (3M)
 Tally Assistant (2M)
 House Keeping Executive (6M)
 Food and Beverage Server (3M)
 Multi Cuisine Commi(Cook) (6M)
 Sattvik Quality Management Auditor (6M)
 Sales Executive (3M)
 GST Assistant (1.5M)

See also 
 SVSU Sr. Sec. Skill School (Feeder School)
 List of institutions of higher education in Haryana

References 

Universities in Haryana